The 2021 Rugby Europe Sevens Conference was the third tier tournament of Rugby Europe's 2021 sevens season. It was held in Belgrade, Serbia on 5–6 June 2021, with the top two advancing to the 2022 Sevens Trophy. As winner of the tournament, Bulgaria advances to Trophy tournament in 2021, with second placed Monaco.

Tournament consist of three phases, with first two used as qualifications for third where teams played for places.

Phase 1 
All times in Central European Summer Time (UTC+02:00)

Pool A

Pool B

Pool C

Phase 2 
All times in Central European Summer Time (UTC+02:00)

Pool D

Pool E

Pool F

Phase 3 
All times in Central European Summer Time (UTC+02:00)

Pool G

Pool H

Pool I

Standings

External links 

 Conference page

References 

2021 rugby sevens competitions
2021 in Serbian sport
June 2021 sports events in Serbia